Arnone is an Italian surname. Notable people with the surname include:

Alberto Arnone (died 1721), Italian painter
John Arnone, American set designer
Lee Arnone-Briggs, American actress
Lorenzo Arnone Sipari (born 1973), Italian nature writer
Matthew Arnone (born 1994), Canadian soccer player
Michael Arnone (born 1932), American politician
Tyler Arnone (born 1991), American soccer player

Other
Cancello e Arnone, municipality in Italy

Italian-language surnames